The 1982–83 Liga Artzit season saw Beitar Tel Aviv win the title and promotion to Liga Leumit. Hakoah Ramat Gan and Maccabi Ramat Amidar were also promoted.

Maccabi Shefa-'Amr, Hapoel Acre and Hapoel Tel Hanan were all relegated to Liga Alef.

It was also the first season that the Three points for a win system was introduced.

Final table

References
1982-83 Hapoel Petah Tikva Museum 
Liga Artzit Davar, 22.5.83, Historical Jewish Press 
Postponed match in Artzit: Hapoel Ashkelon - Kiryat Shmona 0-0 Davar, 22.5.83, Historical Jewish Press 

Liga Artzit seasons
Israel
2